The following are public holidays in Ukraine.

Holidays established by law 

Religious holidays are observed according to the Julian calendar (but here the Gregorian date of Christmas is written).

When a public holiday falls on a weekend (e.g. Saturday or Sunday), the following working day (e.g. Monday) turns into an official day off too.

If only one or only two working days are between a public holiday and another day off then the Cabinet of Ministers of Ukraine usually releases a recommendation to avoid this gap by moving these working days onto a certain Saturday (that is to have uninterrupted vacations, but to compensate this by work on another day which would be a day off). Usually such recommendations only concern those employees whose weekly days off are Saturday and Sunday.

Holidays celebrated by the uniformed organizations 
 26 March — National Guard Day
 30 April — Border Guards Day
 6 May- Day of the Mechanized Infantry 
 18 May — Reservists' Day
 23 May – Naval Infantry Day, Heroes of Ukraine Day
 4 July — Police Day
 8 July – Air and Air Defence Forces Day
 First Sunday in July – Navy Day; From 1997 till 2011 this day was celebrated on August 1
 29 July — Special Operations Forces Day
 8 August – Signal Corps Day
 First Sunday of September — Territorial Defense Forces Day
 7 September – Military Intelligence Forces Day
 9 September – Armoured Forces Day
 14 September – Mobilized Servicemen Day
 29 October – Finance Officers Day
 3 November – Rocket Forces and Artillery Day
 3 November – Corps of Engineers Day
 21 November – Air Assault Forces Day
 6 December – Armed Forces Day; festive fireworks and salutes take place in various cities in Ukraine The holiday was established in 1993 by the Verkhovna Rada (Ukraine's national parliament).
 12 December – Ground Forces Day
 23 December – Operational Servicemen Day

Other national holidays

Fixed date 
 5 January — Anniversary of the Autocephaly of the Orthodox Church of Ukraine
 6 January — Epiphany in the Gregorian Calendar (Catholics, Protestants and some parishes of the Orthodox Church of Ukraine) and Christmas Eve in the Julian Calendar (Orthodox Church of Ukraine)
 14 January — Old New Year
 20 January — Day of Remembrance of the Ukrainian Defenders of the Second Battle of Donetsk Airport (2014-2015)
 19 January — Epiphany in the Julian Calendar (Orthodox Church of Ukraine)
 22 January — Ukrainian Unity Day, marking both the 1918 Fourth Universal of the Ukrainian Central Council and the 1919 Unification Act
 2 February — Candlemas in the Gregorian Calendar (Catholics, Protestants and some parishes of the Orthodox Church of Ukraine)
 15 February — Candlemas in the Julian Calendar (Orthodox Church of Ukraine)
 20 February - Day of Remembrance of the Fallen Martyrs of Euromaidan, the Heavenly Hundred Heroes
 21 February — Anniversary of the 2014 victory of the Revolution of Dignity
 24 February — Mourning Day of the Beginning of the 2022 Russian invasion of Ukraine (beginning 2023) 
 26 February — Day of Resistance to Occupation of Crimea and Sevastopol
 25 March- Day of the Security Service of Ukraine 
 11 May — Saints Cyril and Methodius' Day in the Gregorian Calendar (also Slavonic Literature and Culture Day) (Catholics, Protestants and some parishes of the Orthodox Church of Ukraine) 
 24 May — Saints Cyril and Methodius' Day in the Julian Calendar (also Slavonic Literature and Culture Day) (Orthodox Church of Ukraine)
 22 June  — Day of Remembrance and Sorrow (Anniversary of the Beginning of the Second World War in Ukraine and territories of the former Soviet Union)
 23 June — Day of the Ukrainian Civil Service
 24 June —  Kupala Night in the Gregorian Calendar (Catholics, Protestants and some parishes of the Orthodox Church of Ukraine)
 28 June — Constitution Day
 7 July — Kupala Night in the Julian Calendar (Orthodox Church of Ukraine)
 16 July — Anniversary of the Declaration of State Sovereignty of Ukraine
 28 July — Day of Christianization of Kievan Rus' — Ukraine
 6 August — Feast of the Transfiguration / Apple Feast of the Saviour in the Gregorian Calendar (Catholics, Protestants and some parishes of the Orthodox Church of Ukraine)
 15 August — Feast of the Assumption and Dormition of the Mother of God in the Gregorian Calendar (Catholics, Protestants and some parishes of the Orthodox Church of Ukraine)
 19 August — Feast of the Transfiguration / Apple Feast of the Saviour in the Julian Calendar (Orthodox Church of Ukraine)
 23 August — National Flag Day
 28 August — Feast of Dormition of the Mother of God in the Julian Calendar (Orthodox Church of Ukraine)
 29 August — Day of Remembrance of the Defenders of Ukraine, remembrance day of the great Ukrainian casualties during the Battle of Ilovaisk on August 29, 2014
 31 August — Cincture of the Theotokos in the Gregorian Calendar (Catholics, Protestants and some parishes of the Orthodox Church of Ukraine)
 1 September — Knowledge Day and Eastern Rite Ecclesiastical New Year in the Gregorian Calendar (Orthodox Church of Ukraine and Ukrainian Greek Catholic Church)
 8 September — Feast of the Nativity of Mary in the Gregorian Calendar (Catholics, Protestants and some parishes of the Orthodox Church of Ukraine)
 13 September — Cincture of the Theotokos in the Julian Calendar (Orthodox Church of Ukraine)
 14 September — Ecclesiastical New Year in the Julian Calendar (Orthodox Church of Ukraine)
 21 September — Feast of the Nativity of Mary in the Julian Calendar (Orthodox Church of Ukraine)
 28 October — Liberation from Fascism Day
 31 October — Reformation Day (Most Protestant religious denominations in Ukraine)
 13 November — Reformation Day (Ukrainian Lutheran Church)
 21 November — Dignity and Freedom Day, the anniversaries of both the first Euromaidan protest day in 2013 and the victory of the 2004 Orange Revolution
 6 December — Day of St. Nicholas in the Gregorian Calendar (Catholics, Protestants and some parishes of the Orthodox Church of Ukraine)
 8 December — Feast of the Immaculate Conception in the Gregorian Calendar (Latin Church in Ukraine)
 9 December — Feast of the Conception of the Virgin Mary in the Gregorian Calendar (Orthodox Church of Ukraine and Ukrainian Greek Catholic Church)
 20 December — Day of St. Nicholas in the Julian Calendar (Orthodox Church of Ukraine)
 22 December — Feast of the Conception of the Virgin Mary in the Julian Calendar (Orthodox Church of Ukraine)
 24 December — Christmas Eve (Catholics, Protestants and some parishes of the Orthodox Church of Ukraine, also marked as Day of the State Emergency Service of Ukraine)

Commemorative and remembrance days in honor of Ukrainian victories won in the 2022 Russian invasion of Ukraine
Beginning 2023 the following days are earmarked as days of remembrance and honor in relation to Ukrainian victories during the current (2022) invasion:

 26 March — Victory Day in the Battle of Okhtyrka
 28 March — Victory Day in the Battle of Irpin
 31 March — Victory Day in the Battle of Bucha and Relief of the Siege of Chernihiv
 4 April — Victory Day in the Battle of Sumy

Movable 
 Maundy Thursday — Marked three days before Western Christian and Orthodox Easter
 Good Friday — Marked two days before Western Christian and Orthodox Easter
 Holy Saturday — Marked on the Saturday before Western Christian and Orthodox Easter
 Bright Monday — Monday after Orthodox Easter Sunday
 Feast of the Ascension — Thursday eight days before Pentecost
 Pentecost Sunday in the Gregorian Calendar — 7th Sunday after Easter/Pascha as marked by Catholics and most Protestants
 Whit Monday —  Monday after Pentecost
 Holodomor Memorial Day — Final Saturday of November

See also
Christmas in Ukraine

References

 
Ukraine
Holidays
Ukrainian culture